Frank Williams (1876 – 17 July 1946) was a New Zealand cricketer. He played 26 first-class matches as a wicket-keeper for Otago between 1898 and 1909. 

In the 1920s he was a first-class umpire. He was also a selector for Otago cricket teams, and was one of the selectors who chose the New Zealand teams that toured England in 1927 and 1931.

He worked as a tailor in Dunedin.

See also
 List of Otago representative cricketers

References

External links
 

1876 births
1946 deaths
New Zealand cricketers
Otago cricketers
New Zealand cricket umpires
New Zealand cricket administrators
Sportspeople from Bath, Somerset